Entombed is a Swedish death metal band formed in 1987 under the name of Nihilist. Entombed began their career as an early pioneer of Scandinavian death metal which initially differed from its American counterpart by its distinct "buzzsaw" guitar tone. However, by the early 1990s their sound had broadened to include garage rock and other influences. This new style would eventually be described as death 'n' roll. Entombed has been influenced by bands such as Slayer, Exodus, Black Sabbath, Celtic Frost, Autopsy, Repulsion, Kiss, The Misfits, Motörhead, Discharge, Death and Testament. Along with Dismember, Grave and Unleashed, Entombed has been referred to as one of the "big four" of Swedish death metal.

History

Early career (1987–1991)
Entombed are rooted in the band Nihilist who were formed by drummer Nicke Andersson, guitarist Alex Hellid and bassist Leif Cuzner, who formed the band in 1987. After using a number of temporary vocalists for their initial shows, the band eventually recruited L.G. Petrov, who was the drummer for the band Morbid, which featured Mayhem vocalist Dead. The band also recruited Morbid's session guitarist Uffe Cederlund as a second guitarist, and recorded a number of demos with tracks that would eventually appear on Entombed's debut album. Following increased tensions between band members, the majority of the band decided to rename themselves as Entombed rather than force these members out.

Entombed's debut album Left Hand Path was released in 1990, a cult favorite that established them as a popular Swedish death metal band. Left Hand Path and its follow-up, Clandestine, were unique in that they featured what was sometimes referred to as a "buzz saw" guitar sound. Prior to the recording of Clandestine, Petrov was fired from the band due to personal disputes. The vocals on the album were recorded by Andersson instead, and for the tour following the album's release in 1991, the band hired vocalist Johnny Dordevic, previously a member of the band Carnage.

1992–2000
Petrov eventually reconciled with the band after releasing an album with the band Comecon, and the band eventually released Wolverine Blues in 1993. The album featured a departure of sound from the band's previous work, with a greater influence of hard rock and heavy metal alongside their initial death metal stylings, in a style now often referred to as death 'n' roll. Although the release was divisive amongst the band's fanbase, it established their mainstream and critical reputation. Wolverine Blues is considered a classic of early 1990s death metal.

1998's Same Difference was the band's first album without drummer and founding member Nicke Andersson, who left the band to concentrate on his new project The Hellacopters. He was replaced by Peter Stjärnvind. In 2000, Entombed released Uprising, followed a year later by Morning Star.

2001–2009
In 2001, the band worked with performance artists Carina Reich and Bogdan Szyberb, and the Royal Swedish Ballet. The production was entitled Unreal Estate.

2003 saw the release of Inferno, which was the last album with guitarist Uffe Cederlund (who joined Disfear), bassist Jörgen Sandström and drummer Peter Stjärnvind.

Nico Elgstrand (who produced the album Uprising) joined as bassist in 2004, Olle Dahlstedt (of Alpha Safari and ex–Misery Loves Co.), replaced Stjärnvind in 2006. When Uffe Cederlund left in 2005, no new guitarist was recruited and Alex Hellid remained as the only guitarist.

Serpent Saints – The Ten Amendments was released on 9 July 2007. The album featured a greater influence from traditional death metal and was the band's first release with drummer Olle Dahlstedt and bassist Nico Elgstrand.

2010–2020
In 2010, Victor Brandt joined as bass player and Nico Elgstrand switched to guitars so the band once again had two guitarists.

In April 2013, Entombed performed a set with the Sundsvall Chamber Orchestra at the Nordfest festival.

In 2013, Petrov and Hellid began a legal battle regarding the name Entombed.

In 2014, L.G. Petrov, Olle Dahlstedt, Nico Elgstrand and Victor Brandt formed Entombed A.D. as a result of the band's trademark being held by Hellid.

Hellid, Cederlund, and Säfström reunited to perform "Clandestine" in its entirety with the 65-piece Gävle Symphonic Orchestra and a 40-piece choir in February 2014. Thomas von Wachenfeldt played bass. Nicke Andersson intended to participate, but was prevented by scheduling conflicts.

Hellid, Andersson and Cederlund reunited to perform as Entombed in October 2016. They were joined by Robert Andersson (vocals) and Nicke Andersson's half brother Edvin Aftonfalk (bass), both formerly of the Swedish death metal band Morbus Chron. Their first performance was at the Close-Up Båten festival cruise. In November they performed a double set in Malmö to celebrate the 25th anniversary of Clandestine, where the album was performed in its entirety twice. The first set was a performance by Hellid, Cederlund, Andersson with Säfström and von Wachenfeldt and the Malmö Symphony Orchestra and the second set was a regular performance with Andersson and Aftonfalk.

2021–present
On 7 March, 2021, former vocalist Lars-Göran Petrov died from cholangiocarcinoma, aged 49.

On July 14, 2022, Entombed performed at Gefle Metal Festival. The band consisted of Alex Hellid, Nicke Andersson, Uffe Cederlund and Jörgen Sandström. Vocals were performed by Sandström and guest vocalists Tomas Lindberg, Scott Carlson, Johnny Hedlund, Urskogr, and Cronos. Former Entombed drummer Peter Stjärnvind was guest on drums.

Personnel

Current members
 Alex Hellid - lead guitar (1987–2014, 2016–present)
 Uffe Cederlund – rhythm guitar, keyboards, backing vocals (1987–2005, 2016–present), bass (1989–1990)
 Nicke Andersson – drums (1987–1997, 2016–present), vocals (1992), bass (1989–1990)
 Jörgen Sandström – bass, backing vocals (1995–2004, 2022–present)

Former members
 Mattias Boström – vocals (1987–1988)
 Leif Cuzner – bass (1987–1988; died 2006)
 Johnny Hedlund – bass (1988–1989)
 Lars-Göran Petrov – vocals, keyboards (1988–2014; died 2021)
 David Blomqvist – bass (1989)
 Lars Rosenberg – bass (1990–1995)
 Johnny Dordevic – vocals (1991–1992)
 Orvar Säfström – vocals (1991, 2014)
 Peter Stjärnvind – drums (1997–2006, guest 2022)
 Nico Elgstrand – bass (2004–2010), guitar (2010–2014)
 Olle Dahlstedt – drums (2006–2014)
 Victor Brandt – bass (2010–2014)
 Edvin Aftonfalk - bass (2016–unknown)
 Robert Andersson - vocals (2016–unknown)

Session/guest musicians
 Fred Estby – vocals, drums
 Matti Kärki – vocals
 Peder Carlsson – harmonica
 Anders Lindström – rhythm guitar
 Colten Lavalle - drumtar
 Daniel Rey – spoken word on one song
 Östen Warnerbring – vocals and saxophone for one TV performance
 Thomas von Wachenfeldt – Bass and orchestral arrangements on the Classical Clandestine symphonic concerts

Timeline

Discography

Studio albums
 Left Hand Path (1990)
 Clandestine (1991)
 Wolverine Blues (1993)
 DCLXVI: To Ride Shoot Straight and Speak the Truth (1997)
 Same Difference (1998)
 Uprising (2000)
 Morning Star (2001)
 Inferno (2003)
 Serpent Saints – The Ten Amendments (2007)

References

Bibliography
 Ekeroth, Daniel (2008). Swedish Death Metal. Bazillion Points Books. .

External links

Official website
Entombed @ Threeman Recordings

Swedish death metal musical groups
Musical groups established in 1987
Musical groups disestablished in 2014
Musical groups reestablished in 2016
Musical groups from Stockholm
English-language singers from Sweden
Earache Records artists